Panja Vaisshnav Tej (born 13 January 1989), is an Indian actor who works in Telugu films. He made his debut as a lead in the romantic drama Uppena (2021), which won him the Filmfare Award for Best Male Debut – South, and later starred in the action thriller Konda Polam (2021) and the romance Ranga Ranga Vaibhavanga (2022), both critical and commercial failures.

Early life 
Panja Vaisshnav Tej is the younger brother of Sai Dharam Tej. A member of the Allu–Konidela family, he is nephew of actor Chiranjeevi. Tej did his schooling at Nalanda School, Hyderabad and completed his graduation from St. Mary's College, Hyderabad.

Career
Tej first appeared as a child actor in Johnny (2003), directed by and starring his maternal uncle Pawan Kalyan. He later played a wheelchair-ridden child in Shankar Dada M.B.B.S. (2004), starring his maternal uncle Chiranjeevi. In 2021, he made his debut as a lead with the film Uppena.

His then appeared in the rural drama Konda Polam, co-starring Rakul Preet Singh, under the direction of Krish, followed by Ranga Ranga Vaibhavanga. He has signed a film under the production of Nagarjuna's Annapurna Studios.

Filmography

References

External links

Indian male film actors
Telugu male actors
Male actors in Telugu cinema
21st-century Indian male actors
Living people
1995 births